Jackie Biskupski (born January 11, 1966) is an American Democratic politician, who served as the 35th Mayor of Salt Lake City, Utah.  Upon taking office, Biskupski became Salt Lake City's 35th mayor, the city's first openly gay mayor, and the second female mayor (after Deedee Corradini). She is also a former member of the Utah House of Representatives, representing the 30th District in Salt Lake County from 1999 to 2011.

Early life
In 2009, Biskupski adopted a son named Archie. On August 14, 2016, she married longtime partner Betty Iverson, who also has a son (named Jack). She currently lives in the Sugar House neighborhood of Salt Lake City.

Biskupski holds a Bachelor of Science degree in criminal justice from Arizona State University.

Early career
After graduating from college, Biskupski opened her own private-investigation firm, and later went to work for the auto-insurance industry. Biskupski decided to get involved in politics after a 1995 controversy erupted at East High School (Salt Lake City), when the Board of the Salt Lake City School District and the Utah State Legislature tried to eliminate a gay/straight student alliance club.

In 1997, Biskupski was elected to the Executive Committee for the Salt Lake County Democratic party as well as the Board of Directors for the YWCA of Salt Lake City.

Utah Legislature 
When elected in 1998 to the Utah House of Representatives she became Utah's first openly gay person elected to a state office. She was re-elected 6 times after that, serving in the legislature for 13 years, before retiring in 2011.

In 2000, Biskupski unsuccessfully combated Utah's ban on adoption by same-sex parents and Utah's sodomy law in response to a 1998 bill sponsored by Utah Representative Nora B. Stephens, R-Davis County: H.B. 103 ("Amendments to Child Welfare").

Utah Governor Gary Herbert appointed Brian Doughty in 2011 to replace Utah Representative Jackie Biskupski, D-Salt Lake, when she resigned from the Utah House of Representatives.

She then went to work as an administrator for the Salt Lake County Sheriff's Office on January 31, 2015.

In 2011, Biskupski helped found Utah's Real Women Run initiative which has hosted numerous events since then to encourage female participation in civic leadership and political office.

Mayor of Salt Lake City 
Biskupski was elected to the office of Salt Lake City Mayor on November 17, 2015, defeating two-term incumbent Ralph Becker with 51.55% of the vote, receiving 17,290 votes to Becker's 15,840. During her transition, she called for the resignation of most City department heads, drawing criticism from former Salt Lake City Mayor Rocky Anderson and others.

During her first year in office as mayor, Biskupski made local air quality and climate change issues central to her platform, calling for Salt Lake City to be completely run on alternative energy by 2032 and a reduction in carbon emissions by 80% by 2040.

In 2016, Mayor Biskupski called for the creation of the Department of Economic Development.

In September 2016, after a yearlong negotiation, Biskupski announced a new franchise agreement between Salt Lake City and Rocky Mountain Power in which both parties promised to work together to develop clean-energy projects that would enable Salt Lake City to meet its clean energy goals.

Biskupski also focused on finding long-term treatment solutions to Salt Lake City's growing homeless population. In December 2016, the Mayor announced the locations of four new homeless shelters in the capital city, generating substantial controversy concerning the decision on where to put the shelters and the cost of land acquisition.

In 2017, Biskupski approved of Salt Lake City's first Transit Master Plan, which was designed to implement a frequent transit network (FTN), develop pilot programs and partnerships for employer shuttles and on-demand shared ride services, develop enhanced bus corridors, and implement a variety of transit-supportive programs and transit access improvements that overcome barriers to using transit.

In September 2018, Mayor Jackie Biskupski announced the formation of a Commission Against Gun Violence designed to explore policy questions regarding gun violence and to make funding recommendations to be shared with city, county and state officials, as well as the Salt Lake City School District.

National Leadership 
In 2018, Biskupski was instrumental in the U.S. Olympic Committee selecting Salt Lake City to bid on behalf of the United States, potentially for the 2030 Winter Games.

Biskupski serves as co-chair of Sierra Club's Mayors for 100% Clean Energy.

In August 2018, Salt Lake City was selected to host the 68th United Nations Civil Society Conference , the first time a UN conference took place on US soil outside of New York City.

On November 19, 2018, Biskupski led a group of 21 mayors and council members from around Utah in submitting two amicus briefs with the U.S. District Court for the District of Columbia, supporting the cases challenging President Trump's decisions to shrink Grand Staircase–Escalante (GSE) and Bears Ears National Monuments. The two cases, The Wilderness Society, et al. v. Donald J. Trump and Hopi Tribe, et al. v. Donald J. Trump, will be heard in the D.C. Court after a federal judge denied the Trump Administration's attempt to have the cases moved to the Utah District Court in Salt Lake City.

In June 2017, Biskupski leads Sierra Club's "Mayors for 100% Clean Energy", and joined with the Sierra Club's Ready for 100 campaign in a new effort to engage and recruit mayors to endorse a goal of transitioning to 100% renewable energy in cities throughout the country.

In June 2017, Mayor Biskupski joins 61 U.S. mayors in committing to adopt, honor, and uphold the Paris Climate Agreement goals.

In 2017, The U.S. Conference of Mayors made Biskupski vice chairwoman of Mayors/Business Alliance for a Sustainable Future.

In February 2018, Mayor Biskupski joined hundreds of mayors opposing Clean Power Plan repeal.

In July 2019, United States Conference of Mayors formally adopted Resolution 66 introduced by Biskupski, urging congressional action to combat the impact of climate change through a national price on carbon emissions.

In what was regarded to be a surprise, Biskupski announced on March 16, 2019 that she would not be seeking a second term in the 2019 mayoral election, citing a "serious and complex family situation".

Environment 
Biskupski serves as co-chair of Sierra Club's Mayors for 100% Clean Energy.

In 2016, Salt Lake City became the 16th city in the United States to formally adopt a 100% clean energy plan.

In 2016, Biskupski created Salt Lake City's Department of Economic Development. In July 2016, the Department becomes an official part of SLC government. Since its creation, the new Department has been responsible for attracting or expanding 29 companies in Salt Lake City, resulting in $895,000,000 of capital investment and 9,000 jobs.

In May 2016, Mayor Jackie Biskupski and Rocky Mountain Power CEO Cindy Crane launched a new initiative to double Salt Lake City's current use of clean solar power. Their program, Subcriber Solar, upped the amount of sustainable energy powering government operations from 6% to 12% in 2016, in line with Biskupski's 2020 goal to have 50% of municipal operations powered by renewable energy, and 100% by 2032.

In July 2016, Mayor Jackie Biskupski launched Climate Positive 2040 , Salt Lake City's initiative to transition the community to 100% renewable energy sources by 2032 (adjusted to 2030 in 2019) and to reduce carbon emissions citywide by 80% by 2040.

In keeping with Salt Lake City's clean energy goals set by Biskupski, in 2018, the Salt Lake City Fire Department made history by opening the first two net-zero fire stations in the country.

On February 13, 2019, Biskupski called on Utah's D.C. delegation to leave America's Clean Car Standards alone. Biskupski spoke against the rollbacks currently being worked by the United States Environmental Protection Agency (EPA) and the Trump administration.

Housing 

On December 12, 2017, the Salt Lake City Council voted unanimously to adopt Mayor Biskupski's Growing SLC , a housing plan for the Salt Lake City.

In February 2017, Mayor Biskupski launched the City's first affordable housing plan in 20-years. GrowingSLC  2017-2022 lays out a plan for policy changes, investment, and direct action to create and preserve affordable housing in Salt Lake City. Since 2017, the City has increased the number of units in the City's affordable housing pipeline from 200 in 2016 to more than 2,000 today.

Transportation 
Biskupski created partnerships between Salt Lake City and dockless scooter companies, Lime and Bird to increase transit use by people who live more than a quarter of a mile from the bus or TRAX.

In August 2019, from funding from .05% increase in sales-tax, Salt Lake City launches the first phase of City's Transit Master Plan. Three Frequent Transit Network lines are opened on 900 South, 200 South, and 2100 South.

Infrastructure 
Under Biskupski's leadership, Salt Lake City's International Airport is being entirely rebuilt to create the nation's first 21st century hub airport, a $3.6-billion-dollar project that does not use a single taxpayer dollar.

In November 2018, Salt Lake City voters approve Mayor Biskupski's $87-million bond for road repair.

In keeping with Salt Lake City's clean energy goals set by Biskupski, in 2018, the Salt Lake City Fire Department opened the first two net-zero fire stations in the country.

Gender equality 

In January 2017, in a first of its kind for the State of Utah, Mayor Biskupski issues new City policy providing 6-weeks of paid parental leave for any employee of Salt Lake City government, extending the benefit to recently hired mothers, fathers, and those who become parents through adoption or foster care. Salt Lake County follows Salt Lake City shortly after.

On March 1, 2018 Biskupski signed Salt Lake City's Gender Pay Equity policy which aimed to eliminate systemic bias and discrimination that adds to the under valuation of work performed by women it requires Human Resources to conduct regular audits on gender pay equity and specifically, the policy prohibits individuals participating in City hiring processes from asking an applicant about their current or past salary history.

At the 2019 Salt Lake City Women's March, Biskupski called on Utah to ratify the Equal Rights Amendment, (ERA) which would enshrine gender equality in the U.S. Constitution.

Utah Inland Port 

Biskupski has been a vocal opponent of the Utah Inland Port in its current legal state. Issues cited by Biskupski include loss of local control of the land, lack of transparency in the decision-making process, and environmental disruption.

On March 11, 2019, Biskupski directed the Salt Lake City's Attorney's Office to bring a lawsuit against the port, challenging the legality of the legislation underlying the port's creation.

Public Safety 
In April 2016, Mayor Biskupski announced a plan to restructure SLC911, including addressing staffing issues. By November 2016, numbers show an 84% decrease in mandatory overtime shifts.

In October 2017, Mayor Biskupski issues an executive order directing the release of police body-worn camera footage within 10-days of a critical incident.

In 2018, under Biskupski's leadership, the Salt Lake City Police Department experienced a three-year, 25% decrease in crime citywide.

In July 2019, Mayor Biskupski unveiled new wheelchair lift trailers to expand emergency services response by police, fire.

Public Art 
In April 2017, Biskupski inaugurated 18 permanent public art sculptures in downtown Salt Lake City.

In February 2018, Biskupski launches the Arts for All program which provides eligible residents the opportunity to receive up to four free tickets per year to select performances at the Eccles Theater. To be eligible to enter the ticket drawing, residents must receive Supplemental Nutrition Assistance Program (SNAP) benefits or be eligible for free or reduced school lunches.

In August 2019, Mayor Biskupski completed ColorSLC , the largest public art project in SLC history.

Voting record: Utah Legislature

References

External links

Project Vote Smart - Jackie Biskupski profile
Follow the Money - Jackie Biskupski
2006 2004 2002 2000 1998 campaign contributions
"America's 11 Most Interesting Mayors" from Politico magazine

 

1966 births
20th-century American politicians
20th-century American women politicians
21st-century American politicians
21st-century American women politicians
Arizona State University alumni
Lesbian politicians
LGBT mayors of places in the United States
LGBT people from Minnesota
LGBT state legislators in Utah
Living people
Mayors of Salt Lake City
Democratic Party members of the Utah House of Representatives
People from Hastings, Minnesota
Women mayors of places in Utah
Women state legislators in Utah